is a Japanese voice actress from Saitama Prefecture, Japan. She is best known for the roles of Shizuku Oikawa in The Idolmaster Cinderella Girls video-game and anime series, and Reisalin Stout, the protagonist of the Atelier Ryza series of video-games.

Biography

Filmography

Anime
2014
 Chibi Maruko-chan (2014-2017) as Elementary school boy, boy, Haruko, passerby

2015
 The Idolmaster Cinderella Girls as Shizuku Oikawa
 World Trigger as Fumika Teruya, soldier, younger boy
 Ultimate Otaku Teacher as operator
 Case Closed as colleague (ep 789)
 Yuru Yuri San Hai! as Store woman (ep 9)
 Dragon Ball Super as Clerk (ep 71); Fairy (ep 27); Mouse (ep 74); Woman (ep 75)

2016
 Dragon Ball Super (2016-2017) as fairy, clerk, mouse, woman
 One Piece (2016-2019) as Tontatta, Kid Mink, Town Mink, Mink, maid
 Reikenzan as florist
 Sailor Moon Crystal as female student, clerk
 Magic-kyun! Renaissance as schoolgirl
 Kiss Him, Not Me as seller
 Tiger Mask W as pro wrestler girl, clerk

2017
 Kado: The Right Answer as National Security Agency colleague, journalist
 The Idolmaster Cinderella Girls Theater as Shizuku Oikawa

2018
 Sanrio Boys as girl
 GeGeGe no Kitarō (6th Series) as Masashi
 Release the Spyce as Goe Ishikawa

2020
 Nekopara as Cinnamon
 My Hero Academia as Chikuchi Togeike

2021
 Uma Musume Pretty Derby Season 2 as Mejiro Palmer
 D_Cide Traumerei the Animation as girl

2023
 Atelier Ryza: Ever Darkness & the Secret Hideout as Reisalin Stout

Video games
2014
 Toys Drive (2014-2015) as Taeko Hōjō, Hinata Sakai, Green Mistress
 Bakumatsu Maid Doll Knight as Tokugawa Munakatsu, Otose

2015
 Closers as Irina Shinoda Idolmaster Cinderella Girls as Shizuku Oikawa
 Idolmaster Cinderella Girls Starlight Stage as Shizuku Oikawa
 Kemono Friends as Narwhal, Nilgai, Golden Lion Tamarin
 Sangoku Taisen Smash!2016
 Monmusu Harem as Tensei
 Persona 5 World End Eclipse as Undine

2017
 Xenoblade Chronicles 2 as Patroka

2019 
 Atelier Ryza: Ever Darkness & the Secret Hideout as Reisalin Stout
 Release the Spyce as Goe Ishikawa

2020
 Atelier Ryza 2: Lost Legends & the Secret Fairy as Reisalin Stout
 Vivid Army as Ciel

2021
 Uma Musume Pretty Derby as Mejiro Palmer
 Animae Archae as Reiha, Hayate

2022
 Azur Lane as Reisalin Stout

2023
 Atelier Ryza 3: Alchemist of the End & Secret Key'' as Reisalin Stout

References

External links

 

Living people
Japanese video game actresses
Japanese voice actresses
Voice actresses from Saitama Prefecture
21st-century Japanese actresses
1992 births
Anime singers
Japanese women pop singers